Upton Cheyney is a village near to Bitton and Bristol in South Gloucestershire, England.

References

External links

Villages in South Gloucestershire District